Ee Kanni Koodi is a 1990 Indian Malayalam police procedural drama film directed by K. G. George and produced by Ousepachan Valakuzhy. The film stars Ashwini, Sai Kumar, Sukumari and Thilakan in the lead roles.

Cast

Ashwini as Susan Philip / Kumudam
Sai Kumar as Ravindran
Thilakan as Simon
Jose Prakash as Philip
Sukumari as Annamma
Murali as Vidyadharan
Sethu Lakshmi as Akkaamma
Alleppey Ashraf as Anirudhan
Jagadish as Mani
Jagannatha Varma as Police Officer
Shivaji as Thomas
Rajan P. Dev as Pillai
Suresh as Charlie
KPAC Sabu as Kuttappan
Shyam Mohan as Harshan / Prasad
P. M. Mathew Vellore As Father

Plot
Kumudam (Ashwini), a sex worker, is found dead in her house by her friend Thomas (Shivaji). Thomas is a hotel manager and visits her during the last days of the month when he has off. The film deals with the investigation carried out by Circle Inspector Raveendran (Sai Kumar).

References

External links
 

1990 films
1990s Malayalam-language films
Films directed by K. G. George